The Casentino is the valley in which the first tract of the river Arno flows to Subbiano, Italy.

It is one of the four valleys (alongside Valdarno, Valdichiana, and Valtiberina) in which the Province of Arezzo is divided. Mount Falterona, from which the Arno starts, represents the northern boundary between the Casentino and Romagna. On the east of the valley are the Alpe di Serra and the Alpe di Catenaia, which separate the Casentino from the highest tract of the Valtiberina. On the west there is the Pratomagno, which separates the valley from the Valdarno Superiore. Part of the valley is included in the Foreste Casentinesi, Monte Falterona, Campigna National Park.

The topography of the Casentino is especially various, including both plains and mountains rich in large forests. These mountains have often attracted great saints: it was here that St. Romuald built his hermitages at Camaldoli, and that less than two centuries later St. Francis of Assisi established the Sanctuary of La Verna, the headquarters of the Franciscan order.

The valley's biggest comuni are all located in the Arno valley: among these the biggest are Bibbiena and Poppi, while Capolona, Castel Focognano, Castel San Niccolò, Pratovecchio, Stia, Subbiano are more or less smaller. The villages located on the neighbouring hills and mountains are much smaller. These are Chitignano, Chiusi della Verna, Montemignaio, Ortignano Raggiolo and Talla.

The Casentino is mentioned in the song "Ich hab in Penna einen Liebsten wohnen", from the Italieniches Liederbuch by Hugo Wolf.

See also 
 Etruscan civilization

Bibliography 

Valleys of Italy
Valleys of Tuscany
Geographical, historical and cultural regions of Italy
Province of Arezzo